Antinoria is a genus of Mediterranean plants in the grass family.

 Species
 Antinoria agrostidea (DC.) Parl. - Spain, Portugal, France, Italy, Morocco, Algeria, Libya, Tunisia
 Antinoria insularis Parl. - Spain, Portugal, France, Italy, North Africa, Crete, Turkey, Israel

See also 
 List of Poaceae genera

References 

Pooideae
Poaceae genera